True Confessions Tour was a concert tour by Bob Dylan and Tom Petty and the Heartbreakers. 

A concert video, Hard to Handle, filmed in Sydney, Australia on February 24 and 25 was directed by Gillian Armstrong. The HBO Special was released on Virgin Music VHS in 1986 and CBS/Fox Video laserdisc in 1988.

Background
The tour started with two concerts in New Zealand and thirteen concerts in Australia before four concerts in Japan. Both Dylan and Petty took a break after this tour before returning to the road in June to perform a forty-one date tour of the United States and Canada. During the tour the pair performed two concerts at RFK Stadium in Washington, DC, three concerts at Madison Square Garden in New York City and two concerts at The Spectrum in Philadelphia. The tour came to a close on August 6 in Paso Robles, California. The pair would tour together the following year on the Temples in Flames Tour.

Tour dates

Trivia
On February 5, Dylan premiered:
"Across the Borderline", written by Ry Cooder, John Hiatt and Jim Dickinson.
"I Forgot More Than You'll Ever Know", written by Cecil Null. It was also released on Dylan's album Self Portrait.
"I'm Moving On", written by Hank Snow.
"When the Night Comes Falling from the Sky", from Empire Burlesque.
"Lonesome Town", written by Baker Knight.
"Seeing the Real You at Last", from Empire Burlesque.

On February 10, Dylan premiered:
"Justine", written by Don Harris and Dewey Terrey.
"Uranium Rock", written by Warren Smith

On February 11, Dylan premiered:
"House of the Rising Sun", a traditional folk song. It was also released on Dylan's eponymous debut album.
"Emotionally Yours", from Empire Burlesque.
"Baby, Got to Go", author unknown.

On February 21, Dylan premiered "Never Gonna Be the Same Again", from Empire Burlesque.
On February 25, Dylan premiered "Dark Eyes", from Empire Burlesque. This first attempt failed and the performance was interrupted. "Dark Eyes" is not performed again until Boston, Massachusetts on December 10, 1995.
On June 9, Dylan premiered:
"So Long and Goodbye", written by Weldon Rogers.
"Unchain My Heart", written by Bobby Sharp and Teddy Powell.
"Got My Mind Made Up", written by Bob Dylan and Tom Petty.

On June 11, Dylan also performed "Song for Woody" for the first time since January 6, 1974 in Philadelphia, Pennsylvania. He also premiered:
"We Had It All", written by Donny Fritts and Troy Seals.
"Let the Good Times Roll", written by Leonard Lee.

On June 27, Dylan premiered "Red Cadillac and a Black Moustache", written by Warren Smith.
On July 1, Dylan premiered "I Still Miss Someone", written by Johnny Cash.
On July 19, Dylan performed "I Dreamed I Saw St. Augustine" for the first time since April 22, 1976 in Clearwater, Florida.
On July 24, Dylan premiered "Kansas City", written by Jerry Leiber and Mike Stoller.
On July 31, Dylan premiered "Bye Bye Johnny", written by Chuck Berry.
On August 6, Dylan premiered "Brownsville Girl", from Knocked Out Loaded. However, Dylan performed only the chorus.

Setlist

Typical first leg setlist
Justine
Positively 4th Street
Clean-Cut Kid
I'll Remember You
Trust Yourself
That Lucky Old Sun
Masters of War
A Hard Rain's A-Gonna Fall
Girl from the North Country
It's Alright, Ma (I'm Only Bleeding)
I Forgot More Than You'll Ever Know
Just Like a Woman
I'm Moving On
Lenny Bruce
When the Night Comes Falling from the Sky
Lonesome Town
Ballad of a Thin Man
Seeing the Real You at Last
Rainy Day Women #12 & 35
Across The Borderline
Like a Rolling Stone
I and I
In the Garden
Blowin' in the WindEncore
Rock 'Em Dead
Knockin' on Heaven's Door

Source:

Typical second leg setlist
So Long, Good Luck and Goodbye
Positively 4th Street
Clean-Cut Kid
I'll Remember You
Shot of Love
We Had It All
Masters of War
To Ramona
Shake a Hand
One Too Many Mornings
A Hard Rain's A-Gonna Fall
I Forgot More Than You'll Ever Know
Band of the Hand
When the Night Comes Falling from the Sky
Lonesome Town
Ballad of a Thin Man
Rainy Day Women #12 & 35
Seeing the Real You at Last
Across the Borderline
I and I
Like a Rolling Stone
In the GardenEncore
Blowin' in the Wind
Knockin' on Heaven's Door

Source:

References

External links

BobLinks – Comprehensive log of concerts and set lists
Bjorner's Still on the Road – Information on recording sessions and performances

Bob Dylan concert tours
1986 concert tours
1986 video albums
Bob Dylan video albums
Live video albums
Tom Petty